Harry Ayres may refer to:
 Harry Ayres (footballer) (1920–2002), English footballer
 Harry Ayres (mountaineer) (1912–1987), New Zealand mountaineer
 Harry Morgan Ayres (1881–1948), professor of English Literature at Columbia University